Clemizole is an H1 antagonist.

Synthesis
Benzimidazoles substituted with an alkylamine at position 2 have a venerable history as H1 antihistaminic agents. The standard starting material for many benzimidazoles consists of phenylenediamine, or its derivatives.

Reaction of that compound with chloroacetic acid can be rationalized by invoking initial formation of the chloromethyl amide. Imide formation with the remaining free amino group closes the ring to afford 2-chloromethyl benzimidazole (3). Displacement of halogen with pyrrolidine affords the alkylation product. The proton on the fused imidazole nitrogen is then removed by reaction with sodium hydride. Treatment of the resulting anion with α,4-dichlorotoluene gives the H1 antihistaminic agent clemizole (5).

See also 
 Chlormidazole

References 

Benzimidazoles
Chloroarenes
H1 receptor antagonists
Pyrrolidines